The Opening of regular sessions of the National Congress of Argentina is a ceremony that takes place annually, on March 1. It is headed by the President of Argentina, who before both houses of the National Congress of Argentina, meeting jointly in Legislative Assembly. The president delivers a speech, detailing the state of the country and announcing bills that the executive power may send to the Congress in the coming year. These speeches are delivered in Cadena nacional. The most recent one took place on 1 March 2021, when Alberto Fernández opened the 139º regular sessions.

See also
 State of the Union

References

Government of Argentina
Speeches by heads of state
Annual events in Argentina
Autumn events in Argentina